Jarnages is a commune in the Creuse department in the Nouvelle-Aquitaine region in France.

Geography
The N145 road forms the northern border of the commune.

History
The origins of Jarnages go back a long way. During the Gallo-Roman period it was known as Agarrusacum. In the Middle Ages, its royal châtelain was Bertrand d'Armagnac, Count de la Marche, who had it fortified in 1434. In the 16th century, Jarnages had a certain importance as a Protestant stronghold, but the Governor of the Marane retook it in 1691.

Population

Sights
 The church of St. Pierre, dating from the twelfth century.

See also
Communes of the Creuse department

References

Communes of Creuse